The Shahid Abbaspour Dam, formerly known as Great Reza Shah Dam before 1979 Revolution, is a large arch dam providing hydroelectricity from the Karun River; it is located about  northeast of Masjed Soleiman, in the province of Khuzestan, Iran, and originally completed in 1976, and formerly named "Reza Shah Kabir Dam". The dam was the first of a series of dams planned for development on the Karun River.

The arch dam design was chosen for the narrow, rocky gorge where it is located. The double-curvature arch design withstands the pressure created by the reservoir with a minimum of concrete, because the shape transmits the force of the reservoir downward and laterally, against the rock foundation; this has the effect of strengthening the dam concrete and its foundation by keeping it in compression.

The dam site houses two power stations, one built in 1976 and another built in 1995. The dam's electrical output is connected to the national electrical grid, with most generation occurring during periods of peak demand for electricity.

References

External links

Dams completed in 1976
Energy infrastructure completed in 1976
Energy infrastructure completed in 1995
Hydroelectric power stations in Iran
Reservoirs in Iran
Buildings and structures in Khuzestan Province
Arch dams
Dams on the Karun River
1976 establishments in Iran